The Bishan Otter Family, also known as the Bishan 10 and previously known as the Bishan 5, is a family of smooth-coated otters that reside in Marina Bay, Singapore. The otters have become a popular attraction since they were first spotted in 2014.

Background
The Bishan otter family were first sighted at Bishan-Ang Mo Kio Park in 2014. Originally dubbed the "Bishan 5", the otter family gained national attention in 2015 when the National Parks Board uploaded pictures and videos of them on their Facebook page. That same year, the Bishan otter family relocated to Marina Bay after chasing out another otter family that had been living there. They became known as the "Bishan 10" after the birth of five new pups in 2016.

The smooth-coated otter is currently classified as a critically endangered species in Singapore, and until 1998 there had been no reported sightings since the 1970s. The emergence of the Bishan otter family, along with several other otter families, was noted by The Economist as a reflection of the success of Singapore's greening policy, which included a notable increase in water quality.

Celebrity status
The otter family starred in the David Attenborough documentary Wild City and their exploits are frequently covered by the Singapore media. In 2016, the otter family was voted by The Straits Times readers to represent Singapore on her 51st birthday, beating Singlish, the thumbdrive (which was invented by a Singaporean company), the Singapore passport and the Caméra d'Or-winning Singaporean film Ilo Ilo. They also had received other international press coverage from the French magazine Terre Sauvage.

Incidents

Marina otter family
The Bishan otter family had been involved in several fights with another otter family, dubbed the Marina otter family by the local media. In 2015, the Bishan otters relocated to Marina Bay after chasing out the Marina otter family. Another clash between the two otter families resulted in the death of a Marina otter pup. On 11 June 2017, members of the public intervened to protect the Marina otters from their Bishan rivals by scaring the latter off with loud noises. The incident sparked an internet debate concerning human intervention in fights between the two otter families.

Illegal fishing
There have been reports of wild otters, including the Bishan otters, being injured by illegal fishing activities in Singapore. In January 2017, a female otter believed to be one of the Bishan otters was found with a fishing line and hook embedded in its body. In April 2017, another otter, also thought to be one of the Bishan otters, was injured when a fishing hook became entangled in one of its front paws.

On 14 June 2017, a suspected member of the Bishan otter family was found dead in an illegal fishing trap along the Marina Promenade. The Public Utilities Board stated that they would take enforcement action against the man caught setting up the traps.

References

Mammals of Singapore
Otters